Spring Valley Methodist Episcopal Church (also known as the First Methodist Church and Spring Valley Community Historical Society Museum) is a historic church building at 221 W. Courtland Street in Spring Valley, Minnesota.

It was built in 1876 and was added to the National Register of Historic Places in 1975. This ornate 1876 Gothic Revival church  is now a Spring Valley Community Historical  Society museum.

References

External links
 
 Spring Valley Methodist Church Museum - official site

Churches completed in 1876
Churches on the National Register of Historic Places in Minnesota
Former churches in Minnesota
Gothic Revival church buildings in Minnesota
History museums in Minnesota
Methodist churches in Minnesota
Museums in Fillmore County, Minnesota
National Register of Historic Places in Fillmore County, Minnesota